Piero Lissoni (born July 23, 1956, in Seregno) is an Italian architect and designer, best known for his contemporary furniture design.

In 1986, Lissoni and Nicoletta Canesi founded the interdisciplinary studio Lissoni & Partners in Milan (Italy), focusing on architecture as well as interior and product design. In 1996 the agency for visual communication, directed by Massimo Lissoni, Graph. x, which specializes in brand identity, including catalogs, advertising campaigns, videos, web design, and packaging, responsible since 2007 for the visual coordination of the Venice International Film Festival, organized by La Biennale di Venezia. 

Lissoni Architettura was established in 2013, to take charge of numerous International architectural clients. In 2015, Lissoni Inc. was created in New York, where interior designing for the American, Canadian, and Central and South American markets were developed.

Lissoni and his multinational team cover the areas of architecture, interior and product/light design, graphics, art direction, and corporate identity. Projects extend globally to include private villas, residential buildings, offices, factories, theatres, restaurants, hotels and yachts.

Work 
Piero Lissoni is the art director for Alpi, Boffi, De Padova, Lema, Living Divani, Lualdi and Porro; he designs products and exhibition stands for many of the above brands and other companies including Alessi, Audi, B&B Italia, Bonacina 1889, Cappellini, Cassina, Cotto, Fantini, Gallo, Glas Italia, Golran, Illy, Kartell, Kerakoll Design House, Knoll International, Olivari, Salvatori, Sanlorenzo Yachts, Serapian, Tecno, Viccarbe, Wella. Starting out with kitchen and bathroom designs at Boffi Kitchens in the mid-1980s, Lissoni later established his own architectural firm in Milan. The setup called "Lissoni Associati" still continues to produce architectural work.

Awards 
2005 – Hall of Fame, I.D. Magazine International Design Award – USA

2014 – Winner “XXIII Compasso d'Oro”, ADI/Association for Industrial Design - L16 – Lualdi

2014 – Winner “Meilleure architecture intérieure d’hôtel en Europe”, Prix Villégiature 2014 - Conservatorium Hotel/Amsterdam

2016 – Winner "NYC Aquarium & Public Waterfront" open ideas competition Arch Out Loud/ New York USA

2016 – Winner "Meilleur hotel du Moyen Orient", Prix Villégiature 2016 - Mamilla Hotel/Jerusalem

2017 – Winner "Best Sleepover" Wallpaper* Design Awards - Extrasoft bed/ Living Divani

References

External links
 Lissoni Official website and portfolio
 Selection of pieces by Lissoni

1956 births
Living people
Italian designers
20th-century Italian architects
21st-century Italian architects
People from Seregno